The eighth season of Chicago Fire, an American drama television series with executive producer Dick Wolf, and producers Derek Haas and Matt Olmstead, was ordered on February 26, 2019, by NBC. The season premiered on September 25, 2019. The season concluded on April 15, 2020.

On March 13, 2020, the production of the eighth season was suspended due to the COVID-19 pandemic. Twenty episodes, of a planned 23, were completed.

Cast and characters

Main cast
Jesse Spencer as Captain Matthew Casey, Truck Company 81
Taylor Kinney as Lieutenant Kelly Severide, Squad Company 3
 Kara Killmer as Paramedic in Charge Sylvie Brett, Ambulance 61
 David Eigenberg as Lieutenant Christopher Herrmann, Engine Company 51
 Yuri Sardarov as Firefighter Brian "Otis" Zvonecek, Truck Company 81 (Episode 1)
 Joe Minoso as Firefighter Joe Cruz, Squad Company 3
 Christian Stolte as Firefighter Randy "Mouch" McHolland, Truck Company 81
 Miranda Rae Mayo as Firefighter Stella Kidd, Truck Company 81
 Annie Ilonzeh as Paramedic Emily Foster, Ambulance 61
 Eamonn Walker as Chief Wallace Boden, Battalion 25
 Alberto Rosende as Firefighter Candidate Blake Gallo, Truck 81

Recurring characters
 Andy Allo as Lieutenant Wendy Seager, OFI
 Randy Flagler as Firefighter Harold Capp, Rescue Squad 3
 Anthony Ferraris as Firefighter Tony Ferraris, Rescue Squad 3
 Daniel Kyri as Firefighter Darren Ritter, Engine 51
 Teddy Sears as Chaplain Kyle Sheffield
 Eloise Mumford as Hope Jacquinot
 Hanako Greensmith as Paramedic Violet Mikami of Firehouse 20

Guest characters
 Monica Raymund as Gabriela Dawson (Episode 9)
 Brian Geraghty as Sean Roman (Episode 15)
 Steven Boyer as Assistant Deputy Commissioner Jerry Gorsch (Episode 13)

Crossover characters
Jesse Lee Soffer as Detective Jay Halstead
 Marina Squerciati as Officer Kim Burgess
 Amy Morton as Desk Sergeant Trudy Platt
 Jason Beghe as Sergeant Hank Voight
 Tracy Spiridakos as Detective Hailey Upton 
 Patrick John Flueger as Officer Adam Ruzek 
 LaRoyce Hawkins as Officer Kevin Atwater 
 Lisseth Chavez as Officer Vanessa Rojas
 Nick Gehlfuss as Dr. Will Halstead
 Yaya DaCosta as April Sexton
 Torrey DeVitto as Dr. Natalie Manning
 Dominic Rains as Dr. Crockett Marcel
 Marlyne Barrett as Charge Nurse Maggie Lockwood
 S. Epatha Merkerson as Sharon Goodwin

Episodes

Production
The season premiere featured the departure of original character Brian "Otis" Zvonecek, played by Yuri Sardarov. Executive producer Derek Haas explained that after the seventh season, they were not sure how they would handle the conclusion to the mattress factory fire. They realised that they had placed characters in danger before having them saved too many times. Haas continued, "The audience has to be reminded that these calls are dangerous and sometimes people don't make it. We thought, what if we killed off Otis and he dies heroically? We realized there was so much emotional landscape we could cover." Haas spoke with Chicago creator Dick Wolf about the decision first, before informing Sardarov that he was being written out. Sardarov agreed to return for the eighth-season premiere. Haas confirmed that he considered killing off Darren Ritter (Daniel Kyri), but as he was only introduced in the seventh season, his death would not have the same impact as an original cast member. Otis' death also gave the writers the chance to script a memorial at the firehouse which had not been done in the series before. Haas hoped that Sardarov would agree to reprise the role for future appearances.

Another ongoing storyline follows Paramedic Sylvie Brett (Kara Killmer), who has left Chicago with her fiancé Kyle Sheffield (Teddy Sears) for a small town in Indiana. Haas wanted "to follow through with her agreeing to marry Kyle." He also wanted to bring back her former friend Hope Jacquinot (Eloise Mumford) for the storyline.

Actor Alberto Rosende joins the cast in the recurring role of firefighter Blake Gallo. Haas said the show needed "fresh energy" and called the character a "junior Casey/junior Severide". He added that not everyone in the house is keen on bringing Blake in. On December 13, 2019 it was announced that Rosende was upped to a series regular.

On October 30, 2019, it was announced that former main cast member Monica Raymund would be returning as Gabriela Dawson for the mid-season finale in episode 9, “Best Friend Magic,” on November 20, 2019.

On April 16, 2020, it was announced that Annie Ilonzeh, who plays Emily Foster has left the series after two seasons.

Crossover
The fourth episode of the season begins a crossover event with Chicago Med and Chicago P.D.. Derek Haas and Dick Wolf wrote the story for all three parts and Haas wrote the teleplay for part one. The plot revolves around "a mysterious illness". Another crossover with P.D.  aired on February 26 and  included the return of Brian Geraghty as Sean Roman.

Ratings

References

External links
 
 

2019 American television seasons
2020 American television seasons
Television productions suspended due to the COVID-19 pandemic
Chicago Fire (TV series) seasons